The Border Post is a comedy-drama produced in international cooperation between the countries of the former Yugoslavia and directed by Rajko Grlić. It was released in 2006.

Synopsis
A Yugoslav People's Army military border post on the Yugoslav-Albanian border in the late 1980s is thrown into disarray when its commander Safet Pašić discovers he has syphilis which he contracted from a local prostitute. To conceal his infidelity from his wife, he raises the combat readiness with a fabricated story about an imminent Albanian attack to buy time until he can complete the three-week course of penicillin.

Although the leave is cancelled for all personnel, Pašić secretly sends his doctor Siniša to transport his things from his home or to the barracks. There, Siniša meets Pašić's wife Mirjana who is tired of her husband's military career. After several meetings they start a passionate affair.

Meanwhile, soldiers in the barracks reinforce their positions and try to spend their time. One of the soldiers, Ljuba Paunović, pulls various pranks to be discharged from the army which causes frequent conflicts with Pašić. In honor of deceased President Josip Broz Tito, (inspired by television coverage of the Relay of Youth), Paunović volunteers to march hundreds of kilometers from the barracks to Tito's grave at the House of Flowers in Belgrade. He is then sent to the high command but once there, he says he never actually wanted to march, and that Lt. Pašić had forced him. The high command decides to punish Pašić and sends a group of soldiers to arrest him. On their way, Mirjana joins them to find out what is really happening with her husband.

The sentries at the border post see the approaching military vehicles which they mistake for the Albanian troops and open fire. The shots hit and mortally wound Mirjana, while Paunović and Pašić start begin a fight which leaves Pašić dead.

The film ends with Siniša returning home, visibly shaken.

Cast
 Toni Gojanović - Siniša Sirisčević
 Sergej Trifunović - Ljuba Paunović
 Emir Hadžihafizbegović - Lt. Safet Pašić
 Verica Nedeska - Mirjana (Pašić's wife)
 Bogdan Diklić - Col. Rade Orhideja
 Miodrag Fišeković - Gvozdenović
 Franjo Dijak - Budiščak
 Petar Arsovski - Ilievski
 Tadej Troha - Lanisnik
 Zoran Ljutkov - Milčo
 Igor Benčina - Vladika
 Selim Sendžul - Mica
 Elmedin Leleta - Hasan
 Hrvoje Kečkeš - Miljenko
 Halid Bešlić - Singer

Background and production
From the early 1980s, the plot was moved to 1987, the advanced stage of Serb-Albanian conflict and the beginning of Slobodan Milošević's era. Second lieutenant Pašić's character, originally an ethnic Hungarian, was changed to Bosniak in order to accommodate for Emir Hadžihafizbegović.

The film was shot between May and July 2005, on locations in Bitola, Ohrid, and Galičica mountain.

Awards
Golden Arena, Pula International Film Festival-2006
Golden Arena for Best Supporting Actor (Emir Hadžihafizbegović), Pula International Film Festival-2006
Golden Dolphin, Troia International Film Festival-2007
Best Director, Troia International Film Festival-2007
Audience Award, Trieste International Film Festival-2007
Film and Literature Award, Films by the Sea Festival-2007

References

External links

2006 films
Croatian-language films
Serbian comedy-drama films
2000s action comedy-drama films
Films directed by Rajko Grlić
Films set in Yugoslavia
Films set in 1987
Croatian comedy-drama films
Films based on Croatian novels
Films about military personnel
Films shot in North Macedonia
2006 comedy films
Cultural depictions of Josip Broz Tito
Cultural depictions of Slobodan Milošević
2006 drama films